Ebn-e Babveih Cemetery – Tehran (Rey)
Emamazadeh Abdullah Cemetery – Tehran (Ray)
Behesht-e Zahra – Tehran
Emamzadeh Taher Cemetery – Karaj
Behesht-e Sakineh Cemetery – Karaj
Doulab Christian Cemetery – Tehran (Doulab)
Nor Burastan Cemetery – Tehran (Khavaran)
Tehran War Cemetery  – Tehran (Gholhak)
Tehran Protestant Cemetery  – Tehran (Old Qom Road)
Zahir-od-dowleh cemetery – Tajrish
Khavaran Cemetery – Tehran
Mesgarabad Cemetery – Tehran
Golestan-e Javid Baha'i Cemetery  – Tehran
Beheshtieh Jewish Cemetery  – Tehran
Giliard Jewish Cemetery  – Giliard
Takht-e Foulad Cemetery – Isfahan
New Julfa Armenian Cemetery – New Julfa, Isfahan
Bagh- Rezvan Cemetery (fa) – Isfahan
Sarah bat Asher Cemetery  – Isfahan (Lenjan)
Dar ol-Salaam Cemetery (fa) :fa:دارالسلام شیراز – Shiraz
Vadi-e Rahmat – Tabriz
Maqbarat ol-Sho'ara – Tabriz
Sheikhan cemetery (fa) – Qom
 Bagh-e Ferdows (fa) – Kermanshah

Iran
 
Cemeteries